Camden is a heritage-listed residence at 60 Prospect Street, Rosehill, City of Parramatta, New South Wales, Australia. It was built in 1883. It was added to the New South Wales State Heritage Register on 2 April 1999.

History 
In February 1883, the land was auctioned as part of the first subdivision of Elizabeth Farm.

In 1888, there were only three houses recorded in Prospect Street, but by 1889 there were five, including number 60, built by Thomas S. Staff. In 1891, the house was transferred within the family to James S. Staff, who remained there until 1904.

The house appears to have been occupied by John G. Cousins, then Robert Howarth, who named it "Chelsea" in 1907. In 1908 David Irons moved in, to be replaced by Pascoe E. Pearce in 1911.

In 1913 ownership of "Chelsea" was again transferred back to the Staff family and Sydney N. Staff renamed the house "I-dun-no" in 1916, remaining there until 1919.

William Turnock then occupied the house from 1921 until 1924, Spencer W. Bates from 1925 until 1929 and Percival Whiteside at least until 1932–33.

According to descendants of the original owners the residence became used as a private nursing home and at that time acquired the name of "Camden".

The house was subdivided into two flats with the original internal staircase removed and located externally for access to the upper flat. It is understood that the Craft family resided there between 1940 and 1952 and that in or about 1953 the house was purchased for approximately 2,000 pounds.

The kitchen and bathroom were added  1970.

Description 
Camden is a two-story Victorian Italianate villa of stuccoed brickwork with gabled corrugated iron roof. Three sided bay front on gabled wing with stucco string courses and label moulds, and large elaborately fretted bargeboards. The verandah on the northern and western facades has cast iron columns and lace balustrades, bullnose corrugated iron roof, and timber floors. Flourishing gardens and trees surround the property.

The house has been divided into two self-contained flats by sealing off the internal stair and rebuilding it within the external verandah. Original internal joinery and fireplaces are intact and only minor alterations have occurred. As at 12 September 2003, some work was required to repair cracked plaster ceilings and brickwork; otherwise the structure was in good condition and had been well maintained.

Heritage listing 

Camden is one of the best examples of a mid-Victorian villa house in the Parramatta district. Only six other buildings of similar period and architectural style exist in the Parramatta region.

Camden was listed on the New South Wales State Heritage Register on 2 April 1999 having satisfied the following criteria.

The place is important in demonstrating the course, or pattern, of cultural or natural history in New South Wales.

This item historically significant.

The place is important in demonstrating the principal characteristics of a class of cultural or natural places/environments in New South Wales.

This item is representative.

References

Bibliography

External links

Attribution 

New South Wales State Heritage Register
Houses in Sydney
Articles incorporating text from the New South Wales State Heritage Register
1883 establishments in Australia
Houses completed in 1883